Mark Bryant may refer to:

 Mark Bryant (basketball) (born 1965), retired American professional basketball player
 Mark Bryant (bishop) (born 1949), Church of England bishop
 Mark Bryant (cartoons) (born 1953), British historian of cartoons
 Mark Bryant (politician) (born 1956), American politician
 Mark Bryant (rugby league) (born 1981), professional rugby league player
 Mark Bryant (soccer), retired American soccer defender